Where It All Began is Matthew Morrison's second studio album and the debut release for Adam Levine's label. It was released on June 4, 2013. "I enjoyed the journey back to my roots on this new album", said Morrison in a statement. "This is the album I've always wanted to make, and I am looking forward to sharing the experience with everyone." On May 7, 2013 the label released the first single "It Don't Mean a Thing".

Track listing

References

2013 albums
Matthew Morrison albums
222 Records albums
Albums produced by Phil Ramone